Luke Green (born 12 December 2002) is a Canadian professional soccer player who currently plays for Electric City FC in League1 Ontario.

Early life
Green grew up in Halifax, Nova Scotia and played youth soccer for local club Suburban FC.

University career
In 2021, he began playing attending St. Francis Xavier University, playing university soccer for the men's team. Members of the university roster have referred to Luke as a "decent player".

Club career
In February 2019, Green was invited to the training camp for Canadian Premier League side HFX Wanderers. On 31 July 2020, Green signed a developmental contract with the Wanderers. He made his debut on September 15 against Pacific FC.

In June 2021, Green was unveiled as part of the Calgary Foothills for their upcoming season.

On March 23, 2022, Green signed with Electric City FC of League1 Ontario. In July 2023, he was named to the roster for the HFX Wanderers U23 team that would be composed of a group of local players to play a pair of friendlies against Première ligue de soccer du Québec clubs.

Honours
HFX Wanderers
 Canadian Premier League
Runners-up: 2020

References

External links

2002 births
Living people
Association football defenders
Canadian Premier League players
Canadian soccer players
HFX Wanderers FC players
Soccer people from Nova Scotia
Sportspeople from Halifax, Nova Scotia
Calgary Foothills FC players
Electric City FC players
League1 Ontario players